Acetomicrobium is a genus in the phylum Synergistota (Bacteria). In 2016, the former genus Anaerobaculum was folded into Acetomicrobium.

Etymology
The name Acetomicrobium derives from:Latin noun , vinegar; New Latin neuter gender noun  (from Greek adjective , small and Greek noun , life), a microbe; New Latin neuter gender noun Acetomicrobium, a microorganism producing acetic acid.

Phylogeny

Species
The genus contains five species (including basonyms and synonyms), namely:
 A. faecale corrig. Winter et al. 1988 (Latin noun  , dregs, faeces; Latin neuter gender suff. -ale, suffix denoting pertaining to; New Latin neuter gender adjective , pertaining to faeces, fecal.)
 A. flavidum Soutschek et al. 1985 (Latin neuter gender adjective , yellowish.)
 A. hydrogeniformans (Maune & Tanner 2012) Ben Hania et al. 2016
 A. mobile (Menes & Muxi 2002) Ben Hania et al. 2016
 A. thermoterrenum (Rees et al. 1997) Ben Hania et al. 2016

See also
 List of bacterial orders
 List of bacteria genera
 Bacterial taxonomy
 Microbiology

References 

Bacteria genera
Synergistota